Gulf Oil Company Filling Station or similar may refer to:

Gulf Oil Company Filling Station (Stamps, Arkansas)
Gulf Oil Company Service Station (Paragould, Arkansas)